The 1992 Brisbane Broncos season was the fifth in the club's history and they competed in the NSWRL's 1992 Winfield Cup premiership. Under new captain Allan Langer they finished the regular season 1st to claim their first minor premiership before going on to play in their first grand final and win, transporting the Winfield Cup trophy north of the New South Wales border for the first time. The Broncos then also became the first Australian club to win the World Club Challenge.

Season summary
After the retirement of Gene Miles, the captaincy role fell onto half-back Allan Langer for the 1992 season. Despite failing to make the finals the previous season, the Broncos were at the top of the ladder for most of this year's competition, losing just four matches to gain their first minor premiership with a 6-point buffer over second placed St George Dragons.

In their first Grand Final appearance the Broncos comprehensively defeated the Dragons 28-8 at the Sydney Football Stadium and finally the Winfield Cup was transported to Queensland for the first time. A month later, the Broncos played in the 1992 World Club Challenge match against dominant British champions Wigan. No Australian club had yet gone to England and won, and many expected the Broncos to follow that trend. They didn't, smashing the cherry pickers in emphatic fashion 22-8.

Wigan and the Broncos met again in the final of the 1992 World Sevens tournament, which Brisbane lost.

Match results

 *Game following a State of Origin match

Scorers

Grand final
                               Brisbane Broncos vs. St. George Dragons

Brisbane 28 (Tries: Langer 2, Cann 2, Renouf; Goals: Matterson 4/5)

defeated

St George 8 (Tries: Walford, Gourley; Goals: Herron 0/2 )

Halftime: Brisbane 6-4

Referee: Greg McCallum

Stadium: Sydney Football Stadium

Crowd: 41, 560

Clive Churchill Medal: Allan Langer (Brisbane)

Honours

League
Nil

Club
Player of the year: Kerrod Walters
Rookie of the year: Brett Galea
Back of the year: Allan Langer
Forward of the year: Trevor Gillmeister
Club man of the year: Allan Langer

References

Brisbane Broncos seasons
Brisbane Broncos season